The Miraflores Adventist Educational Institution (commonly known as Miraflores Adventist College, or CoAM for its Spanish acronym) (Spanish: Institución Educativa Adventista Miraflores — Colegio Adventista Miraflores) is a private co-educational Seventh-day Adventist high school located in the urban district of Miraflores, Lima, Peru. Established in 1919 by representatives of the General Conference of the Seventh-day Adventist Church as Industrial College, the college is part of the Seventh-day Adventist education system, the world's second largest Christian school system.

Spiritual aspect
Students are required to take religion classes each year. These classes cover topics in biblical history and Christian and denominational doctrines. Instructors in other disciplines also begin each class period with prayer or a short devotional thought. The student body gathers every week in the auditorium for an hour-long chapel service. Outside the classrooms there is year-round spiritually oriented programming that relies on student involvement.

Notable alumni
 Walter Manrique Pacheco – educator; former Member of Congress (2000-2001)
 Rubén Castillo Anchapuri – theologist and biologist; first President of the Peruvian Union University
 Carlos Augusto Vela – musician; Head of the Superior Section of the National University of Music
 Andy Icochea Icochea – musician; Director of the Vienna Boys' Choir (2005-2011) and Artistic Director of PALS Children Chorus, USA

See also
 List of Seventh-day Adventist secondary schools
 Seventh-day Adventist education

References

Secondary schools affiliated with the Seventh-day Adventist Church
Educational institutions established in 1953
Religious schools in Peru
Schools in Lima
Private schools in Peru
1953 establishments in Peru